Kooiwijk  is a hamlet in Molenlanden, which is a municipality in the Dutch province of South Holland. Kooiwijk is 1 km north of the village of Oud-Alblas

References 
 Equivalent article on the Dutch Wikipedia.

Populated places in South Holland
Molenlanden